Robert Leino (born April 14, 1993) is a Finnish professional ice hockey player. He is currently playing with Örebro HK of the Swedish Hockey League (SHL).

Playing career
Leino made his Liiga debut playing with HPK during the 2012–13 Liiga season
 and has also played for HIFK and Ilves.

Following his eighth season in the Liiga in 2019–20, Leino left Finland as a free agent and agreed to a three-year contract with Örebro HK of the SHL on 11 May 2020.

References

External links

1993 births
Living people
Finnish ice hockey forwards
HIFK players
HPK players
Ilves players
Örebro HK players
Peliitat Heinola players
People from Hämeenlinna
SaPKo players
Sportspeople from Kanta-Häme